In January 2007, the 110th United States House of Representatives approved , the Medicare Prescription Drug Price Negotiation Act, a bill to require federal officials to negotiate with drug companies for lower prices for the 23 million senior citizens who have signed up for Medicare's prescription drug coverage. The bill was never passed into law. It would have repealed a ban on letting the government negotiate with manufacturers for lower prices — a provision that was part of the GOP-sponsored 2003 measure called the Medicare Prescription Drug, Improvement, and Modernization Act, which created the prescription drug program.

Legislative history

References

Medicare and Medicaid (United States)
United States proposed federal health legislation
Proposed legislation of the 110th United States Congress
Proposed legislation of the 111th United States Congress
Proposed legislation of the 112th United States Congress
Proposed legislation of the 113th United States Congress
Proposed legislation of the 114th United States Congress
Proposed legislation of the 115th United States Congress
Proposed legislation of the 116th United States Congress
Proposed legislation of the 117th United States Congress
Drug pricing